Ruth Genner (born 13 January 1956) is a Swiss politician. She was a member of the government of the city of Zürich (2008–2014), a member of the Swiss National Council (1998–2008) and leader of the Green Party of Switzerland (2001–2008). Genner was a member of the Council of Europe and regularly worked with the United Nations as the President of the Inter-European Parliamentary Forum on Population and Development.  

Genner is a food engineer (Swiss Federal Institute of Technology). She was the chairman of the Swiss Aids Federation and in the board of directors of the company bio.inspecta.

External links

1956 births
Living people
Members of the National Council (Switzerland)
Green Party of Switzerland politicians
Women members of the National Council (Switzerland)
20th-century Swiss women politicians
20th-century Swiss politicians
21st-century Swiss women politicians
21st-century Swiss politicians